Fairview, West Virginia may refer to the following places in the U.S. state of West Virginia:
Fairview, West Virginia, a town in Marion County
Fairview, Marshall County, West Virginia, an unincorporated community in Marshall County
Fairview, Mason County, West Virginia, an unincorporated community in Mason County
Fairview, Mingo County, West Virginia, an unincorporated community in Mingo County
Fairview (near Elkins), Randolph County, West Virginia, an unincorporated community in Randolph County near the city of Elkins
Fairview (near Helvetia), Randolph County, West Virginia, an unincorporated community in Randolph County near the community of Helvetia
Fairview, Wetzel County, West Virginia, an unincorporated community in Wetzel County
Fairview, Greenbrier County, West Virginia, a ghost town in Greenbrier County
New Manchester, West Virginia, an unincorporated community in Hancock County was formerly known as "Fairview"
Wayne, West Virginia, the county seat of Wayne County was originally incorporated as Fairview